Hanjiang may refer to the following in China:

 Han River (Yangtze River tributary), a tributary of the Yangtze, in Shaanxi and Hubei
 Han River (Guangdong), mostly in Guangdong, flowing into the South China Sea
 Hanjiang District, Putian, Fujian
 Hanjiang District, Yangzhou, Jiangsu
 Hanjiang, Shishi, town in Shishi, Fujian

See also
Han River (disambiguation)